The Bomb may refer to:
 A nuclear weapon, from "the atomic bomb"
 The Bomb (film), PBS-TV documentary about the history of nuclear weapons
 The Bomb, BBC radio documentary by D. G. Bridson on consequences of nuclear bombing of Britain
 The Bomb, history written by Howard Zinn
 The Bomb (Harris novel), a 1909 novel by Frank Harris about the Haymarket affair
 The Bomb (Taylor novel), a 1995 young adult novel by Theodore Taylor
 "The Bomb", fourth episode of the 1966 Doctor Who serial The Ark
 "The Bomb! (These Sounds Fall into My Mind)", a 1995 song by The Bucketheads
 "The Bomb", a 2007 single by New Young Pony Club
 The Bomb (band), a Chicago punk band featuring Jeff Pezzati of Naked Raygun
 "The Bomb", a song by Bitter:Sweet from the 2008 album Drama

See also 
 Da bomb (disambiguation)
 Bomb (disambiguation)